Frederick VI or Friedrich VI may refer to: 

Frederick VI, Duke of Swabia (1167–1191)
Frederick VI, Count of Zollern (died 1298)
Frederick VI, Margrave of Baden-Durlach (1617–1677)
Frederick VI, Landgrave of Hesse-Homburg (1769–1829)
Frederick VI of Denmark (1768–1839)